Whitehorse is a city in Yukon, Canada.

Whitehorse may also refer to:

 Whitehorse, Chester County, Pennsylvania, United States
 Whitehorse, South Dakota, United States
 City of Whitehorse, Victoria, Australia
 Whitehorse (electoral district), former electoral district in Yukon, Canada
 Whitehorse (band), a Canadian folk rock band
 Whitehorse (album), 2011
 , a 1998 ship of the Canadian Forces
 Whitehorse, Native American actor who portrayed Geronimo in Stagecoach (1939 film)

See also

White horse (disambiguation)